Casanova is a 1918 Hungarian film directed by Alfréd Deésy and starring Deesy in the title role. For years, this film was listed in reference books as a Bela Lugosi film, since originally Star Films advertised that Lugosi was set to play Casanova. He was replaced, however, at the last minute by the director Alfred Deesy, who decided to play the role himself. If indeed Lugosi shot any scenes for this film, they did not wind up in the finished product. The film nevertheless still turns up occasionally in Lugosi's filmography, perhaps bacause Lugosi had played Casanova previously on the Hungarian stage.

Cast
In alphabetical order

 Péter Andorffy as Hilmer
 Viktor Costa
 Norbert Dán as Prince Roland
 Alfréd Deésy as Casanova
 László Faludi as Paul
 Tessza Fodor
 Annie Góth as Princess Felsenburg
 Sandy Igolits as Clara
 Richard Kornai as Minister of Foreign Affairs
 Ila Lóth as Ninette
 Gyula Margittai as Count Waldenstein
 Marel Rolla
 Sári Sólyom as Derusse
 Margaretta Tímár as Margaretta Hilmer
 Gusztáv Turán
 Miklós Ujvári as the Father
 Camilla von Hollay as Margit (as Hollay Kamilla)
 Lucy Wett as Suzanne Hilmer
 Bela Lugosi (was edited out of the film and does not appear)

See also
 Béla Lugosi filmography

References

External links

1918 films
Hungarian black-and-white films
Hungarian silent films
Films about Giacomo Casanova
Films set in the 18th century
Cultural depictions of Giacomo Casanova
Films directed by Alfréd Deésy
Austro-Hungarian films